Tiran (also Romanized as Tīrān; also known as Tihrun) is a village in Ravar Rural District, in the Central District of Ravar County, Kerman Province, Iran. At the 2006 census, its population was 122, in 41 families.

References 

Populated places in Ravar County